Ruth Chepng'etich, often spelt Ruth Chepngetich, (born 8 August 1994) is a Kenyan road racing athlete, who competes in the marathon and other long distance events. She was the 2019 Marathon World champion in hot and humid conditions. Chepng'etich twice won the Chicago Marathon, in 2021 and 2022. Her personal best in the marathon sits second on the world all-time list. She holds the third-fastest mark of all time for the half marathon.

She is related to Rosefline Chepngetich.

Career
In 2018, Ruth Chepng'etich won the women's only road race at the 40th Istanbul Marathon (World Athletics Label Road Race). She ran 2:18:35 (31:59 – 10 km, 48:15 – 15 km, 1:08:22 – Half marathon, 1:37:42 – 30 km), a race record, best performance ever on Turkish soil, and the seventh best time in history, becoming the 10th athlete of all time to go below 2:19 and 30th under 2:20.

2019
At the 20th Dubai Marathon, Chepng'etich celebrated victory in a course record-breaking time of 2 hours, 17 minutes and 8 seconds.

She ran the then-20th fastest Half marathon of all-time at the Bahrain Night Half Marathon in a time of 66m 9s.

Chepng'etich achieved the then-12th fastest Half marathon of all-time at the Vodafone Istanbul Half Marathon with a 65m 30s clocking.

On 28 September, she won the world title during the 2019 World Athletics Championships in Doha, Qatar, clocking 2:32.43 after a start at midnight during very hot and humid conditions. The silver medal went to Rose Chelimo representing Bahrain with 2:33:46, and bronze to Namibia's 39-year-old Helalia Johannes with 2:34:15. Chepng'etich's time was the slowest world championship winning time so far. The second slowest happened in 2007 when Catherine Ndereba won in 2:30.37 in Osaka. Only 40 out of 68 starters finished the race in Doha.

2020–21
On 4 October, she finished third in London Marathon.

On 4 April 2021, Chepng'etich set a half marathon world record of 1:04:02 at the Istanbul Half Marathon in Turkey, taking 29 seconds off the previous best set by Ababel Yeshaneh in 2020.

On 10 October, she took her first victory at a World Marathon Major by winning the 2021 Chicago Marathon with a time of 2:22:31. She went out fast (67:34 first half) and concluded very much slower (74:57), but stil won by nearly two minutes.

2022–present
On 13 March, Chepng'etich posted the second-fastest ever women-only marathon time to win the Nagoya Women's Marathon in Japan (World Athletics Elite Platinum Label). She ran a negative split 2:17:18 (69:03 / 68:15), which being also the joint seventh-fastest time in history, and obviously a course record, gave her 87 seconds margin of victory. She won $250,000, which was the biggest official prize in professional running up to that point.

On 9 October, petite Kenyan successfully defended her Chicago title at the 2022 Chicago Marathon with a time of 2:14:18, a personal best by almost three minutes, the second-fastest time in history, and just 14 seconds outside of the compatriot Brigid Kosgei's world record (2:14:04). Chepng'etich ran most of the race well under world record pace as she went out very fast with first 10 miles (49:49) faster than the standing world best. She clocked first half in 65:44 before running her second half a lot slower (68:34). The win made her the first woman in history to break the 2:18-barrier on three separate occasions. Chepng'etich's split times:

Achievements

Personal bests

International competitions

National championships
 Kenyan Athletics Championships
 10,000 metres: 2022
 Kenyan Cross Country Championships
 Senior women's race: 2023

References

External links

Living people
1994 births
Kenyan female long-distance runners
Kenyan female marathon runners
Kenyan female cross country runners
People from Rift Valley Province
World Athletics Championships winners
World Athletics Championships athletes for Kenya
Athletes (track and field) at the 2020 Summer Olympics
Olympic athletes of Kenya
Chicago Marathon female winners